Walter Joseph Stanky, born Walter Joseph Stankiewicz Jr. (February 24, 1911 – March 1978), was an American professional basketball player. He played in a number of amateur, semi-professional, and professional basketball leagues during the 1930s and 1940s. In the National Basketball League, Stanky played for the Warren Penns, Cleveland White Horses, Detroit Eagles, and Oshkosh All-Stars and averaged 5.7 points per game for his career.

References

1911 births
1978 deaths
American men's basketball players
Basketball players from Pennsylvania
Centers (basketball)
Cleveland White Horses players
Detroit Eagles players
Elmira Colonels (basketball) players
Forwards (basketball)
Oshkosh All-Stars players
Sportspeople from Erie, Pennsylvania
Warren Penns players